Jack Charlesworth may refer to:
 Jack Charlesworth (footballer)
 Jack Charlesworth (trade unionist)

See also
 John Charlesworth (disambiguation)